Ha Min-ah (born 9 November 1995) is a South Korean taekwondo practitioner. 

Ha won a gold medal in flyweight division at the 2015 World Taekwondo Championships in Chelyabinsk, a gold medal in the bantamweight division at the 2018 Asian Taekwondo Championships in Ho Chi Minh City, and a silver medal in flyweight division at the 2016 Asian Taekwondo Championships.

References

External links

1995 births
Living people
South Korean female taekwondo practitioners
Medalists at the 2018 Asian Games
Asian Games silver medalists for South Korea
Asian Games medalists in taekwondo
Taekwondo practitioners at the 2018 Asian Games
World Taekwondo Championships medalists
Medalists at the 2019 Summer Universiade
Asian Taekwondo Championships medalists
Universiade silver medalists for South Korea
Universiade medalists in taekwondo
20th-century South Korean women
21st-century South Korean women